Ateloptila is a monotypic moth genus in the family Geometridae erected by Edward Meyrick in 1886. Its only species, Ateloptila confusa, first described by Warren in 1900, is found in Australia.

References

Ennominae
Geometridae genera